Michel Charasse (8 July 1941 – 21 February 2020) was a member of the French Senate. He represented the Puy-de-Dôme department, and was a member of the Socialist Party.

On 24 February 2010 French president Nicolas Sarkozy nominated him as a member of the Constitutional Council.

References

External links
Page on the Senate website

1941 births
2020 deaths
Deaths from cancer in France
Politicians from Auvergne-Rhône-Alpes
French Senators of the Fifth Republic
Socialist Party (France) politicians
Sciences Po alumni
People from Chamalières
Senators of Puy-de-Dôme
Officiers of the Légion d'honneur
Mayors of places in Auvergne-Rhône-Alpes
French people of Italian descent
French Ministers of Budget